Huejotitán   is one of the 67 municipalities of Chihuahua, in northern Mexico. The municipal seat lies at Huejotitán. The municipality covers an area of 484.8 km².

As of 2010, the municipality had a total population of 1,049, up from 1,036 as of 2005. 

The municipality had 51 localities, none of which had a population over 1,000.

Geography

Towns and villages
The municipality has 40 localities. The largest are:

References

Municipalities of Chihuahua (state)